Cotton Tree Drive is a road running from Central to Mid-Levels, Hong Kong Island, Hong Kong.
The road is famous for the Cotton Tree Drive Marriage Registry, a hotspot for marriage registration inside Hong Kong Park. It used to be known as Kapok Drive.

The road starts from Harcourt Road and runs with flyovers over Queensway. It then drives uphill and ends in Garden Road with a branch to Kennedy Road.

The road is featured in Project Gotham Racing 2 along with Harcourt Road and many others from various locations.

Major buildings
Far East Finance Centre
Lippo Centre
Flagstaff House (#10), within Hong Kong Park
Central Fire Station (#15)
Cotton Tree Drive Marriage Registry (#19), within Hong Kong Park
Murray Building (#22)
Hong Kong Squash Centre (#23)
Hong Kong Park Sports Centre (#29)
Peak Tram lower terminus: Garden Road stop, located on the bottom floor of St. John's Building
St. Joseph's College

See also
 List of streets and roads in Hong Kong

References

External links

Central, Hong Kong
Mid-Levels
Roads on Hong Kong Island